The Threat is a 1949 American film noir starring Michael O'Shea, Virginia Grey and Charles McGraw, and directed by Felix E. Feist.

Plot
Detective Ray Williams (Michael O'Shea) is recuperating from a broken rib as his wife Ann (Julie Bishop) tries to persuade him to get a desk job, especially with their new baby on the way. However, a call from the police inspector (Robert Shayne) informs him that homicidal criminal "Red" Kluger (whom Ray apprehended) has escaped from Folsom Prison. As Ray is about to leave in his police car, he is kidnapped by Kluger (Charles McGraw) and his men. They also kidnap district attorney Barker MacDonald (Frank Conroy). Kluger has sworn that he would kill both men for sending him to prison. Lastly, nightclub singer Carol (Virginia Grey), who apparently ratted Kluger out, is kidnapped. However, she repeatedly denies being the rat and claims the rat was Tony, Kluger's partner. Kluger doesn't believe her; he has arranged for Tony to come up from Mexico City to the small desert town of Banning to give Red and his gang part of the proceeds from the robbery that Kluger went to prison for and provide them with a small plane to escape the country in. Kluger makes no secret of his plans to kill Ray and MacDonald once he's made a getaway. Kluger also takes another hostage, Joe Turner, the unsuspecting driver of a truck the gang hires to haul an unspecified load to Palm Springs. The load turns out to be a car containing Kluger, all of his gang except for one henchman (who rides up front with Joe to keep an eye on him), Carol, and the two kidnap victims. The gang successfully eludes the police roadblocks and make their way to a shack outside Banning, where they await Tony, handcuffing Ray and MacDonald in a back room. Joe tries to escape with a gun he had taken from the truck earlier, but Kluger convinces him to give up the gun by pointing out that the other henchmen will shoot him if he shoots Kluger, and then kills him once he is unarmed.

By threatening to torture the older MacDonald, Kluger forces Ray to give the police a false lead on the radio to throw them off. Ray surreptitiously leaves a clue for his wife that he is in danger by asking the police radio man to tell his wife to give his regards to their unborn child, Dexter, which his wife finds suspicious due to Ray's previous statements that he'd name the newborn Dexter only if he had a gun to his back. As the henchmen drink beer and doze in the heat, Carol manages to slip the handcuff keys to Ray and MacDonald in the back room. Ray and MacDonald subdue and tie up the henchmen, then call out to Kluger to come get them. Kluger shoots through the door to the back room, spreading his bullets and hitting Ray in the leg. When Kluger hears Tony's plane overhead, he rushes outside to signal to it. Despite his wound, Ray climbs up into the rafters above the door to the back room, as MacDonald tries to bait Kluger to come to them. As Kluger approaches the door, Ray jumps Kluger, knocking Kluger's gun away. Kluger overpowers Ray and incapacitates him by smashing a chair over his head. Before Kluger can retrieve his gun and finish Ray off, Carol picks up the gun and shoots Kluger twice, killing him. Ray gets up and thanks her, saying that he will deal with Tony.

The film ends with Ray talking with Ann about the naming of their child, and she reveals that only one will be named Dexter – because they're having twins.

Cast
 Michael O'Shea as Detective Ray Williams
 Virginia Grey as Carol
 Charles McGraw as Arnold "Red" Kluger
 Julie Bishop as Ann Williams
 Frank Conroy as District Attorney Barker MacDonald
 Robert Shayne as Inspector "Murph" Murphy
 Anthony Caruso as Nick Damon
 Don McGuire as Joe Turner
 Frank Richards as Lefty
 Michael McHale as Detective Jensen

Reception
When released The New York Times gave the film a positive review, writing, "...[the film is] reasonably well written...[and] Charles McGraw is first-rate as the gravel-voiced, square-jawed, ruthless gangster, while Michael O'Shea, Virginia Grey and Frank Conroy chip in with adequate portrayals of the cop, district attorney and gangster's moll. Crime, after all, does not pay, but Mr. McGraw can make it diverting."

References

External links
 
 
 
 
 

1949 films
1940s crime thriller films
American crime thriller films
American black-and-white films
Film noir
Films directed by Felix E. Feist
Films shot in California
Films scored by Paul Sawtell
1940s English-language films
1940s American films